Khlong Bangkok Yai (lit: 'Big Bangkok Canal') is a historic khlong (คลอง; canal) of Bangkok. The current length is 6 km (about 3 mi), through various canals as far as it terminates when it meets Khlong Mon near the confluence of three canals, Khlong Chak Phra, Khlong Mon and Khlong Bang Chueak Nang. In total, the canal passes through three districts, namely Bangkok Yai, Thon Buri and Phasi Charoen.

History 
The course of Khlong Bangkok Yai was originally a meandering part of the Chao Phraya River, which used to be longer than in the present day. Those who travel by boat must cruise along the river, which took more than one day. In the reign of King Chairachathirat (1534–46) of the Ayutthaya Kingdom, he ordered the construction of a canal bypassing a loop of the Chao Phraya River, known as Khlong Lat Bangkok (คลองลัดบางกอก; 'Bangkok Short-Cut Canal'), thus reducing travel times. The Chao Phraya then changed course along the new canal, and the old course became what is known today as Khlong Bangkok Yai (lower section) and Khlong Bangkok Noi (upper section).

In the reign of King Taksin (1767–82) of the Thonburi Kingdom, he founded the new capital, Thonburi, on the west side of the Chao Phraya River. The banks of Khlong Bangkok Yai became the residence of many people, including much of the nobility, giving rise to the names Khlong Bang Luang or Khlong Bang Kha Luang (คลองบางหลวง, คลองบางข้าหลวง; 'Canal of Nobles'). Khlong Bangkok Yai was also the first canal in Thailand to have lampposts installed. 

Khlong Bangkok Yai is now a waterway and drainage. It is also a major site of cultural tourism of Bangkok. There are many houses of worship on both sides, such as Wat Molilokayaram, Wat Hongratanaram, Wat Nuannoradit, Wat Kalayanamitr, Wat Paknam Bhasicharoen, Wat Kuhasawan, Bang Luang Mosque, Tonson Mosque, and Kudi Charoenphat, and also historic places such as Khlong Bang Luang Artist House, Talat Phlu or Wichai Prasit Fort.

See also
Khlong Bangkok Noi– counterpart canal

References

Canals in Thailand
Bangkok Yai district
Thon Buri district
Phasi Charoen district
History of Bangkok
Tourist attractions in Bangkok
Chao Phraya River